Senator Givens may refer to:

Bruce Givens (born 1956), Kansas State Senate
David P. Givens (born 1966), Kentucky State Senate